Longs Run is a  long 2nd order tributary to Castleman Run in Brooke County, West Virginia.

Course
Longs Run rises about 2 miles south-southeast of West Liberty, West Virginia, in Ohio County and then flows northeasterly into Brooke County to join Castleman Run about 2 miles south-southeast of Bethany, West Virginia.

Watershed
Longs Run drains  of area, receives about 40.5 in/year of precipitation, has a wetness index of 293.77, and is about 60% forested.

See also
List of rivers of West Virginia

References

Rivers of West Virginia
Rivers of Brooke County, West Virginia
Rivers of Ohio County, West Virginia